Fusarium oxysporum f.sp. momordicae is a fungal plant pathogen infecting bitter gourd (Momordica charantia), resulting in fusarium wilt. It is a forma specialis (f.sp.) of Fusarium oxysporum.

References

oxysporum f.sp. momordicae
Forma specialis taxa